Howth Junction & Donaghmede railway station serves the area of Donaghmede, and parts of Kilbarrack in Dublin, Ireland.
One entrance is located in Donaghmede, the other in Kilbarrack, and it is where the line to Howth branches off the Belfast–Dublin line, making it the key exchange station on the northern section of the DART suburban railway system.

History
Howth Junction station opened on 1 October 1848.

2021 assault
A woman was knocked onto a rail track at the station around 9pm on 1 April 2021. CCTV of the incident circulated on social media. It showed teens standing on the platform. When one woman ran by, two teens attempted to shove her, one of them moving his bike into her path. A second woman with a bag ran by, the bike was shoved in her direction and she fell under the DART. Onlookers tried to help her and a security guard helped her as onlookers urged the driver not to move off in case she was injured. Youths were seen on CCTV moving away from the incident. Gardaí are treating it as an assault.

On 13 May 2021 Gardaí announced they had arrested three teenagers, two aged 16 and one aged 13. Gardaí announced that they had started a search of five locations pursuant to section 10 of the Criminal Justice (Miscellaneous Provisions) Act, 1997. The teens were arrested under suspicion of violent disorder under the Public Order Act 1994. All three were detained under Section 4 of the Criminal Justice Act 1984. They were held at Garda stations in Coolock, Raheny and Clontarf.

Operations
The ticket office is open from 5:45 AM to 8:00 PM, Monday to Sunday.

See also
 List of railway stations in Ireland

References

External links
 Irish Rail Howth Junction Station Website
 Eiretrains - Howth Junction Station

Iarnród Éireann stations in Dublin (city)
Railway stations opened in 1848
Donaghmede
Railway stations in Fingal
1848 establishments in Ireland
Railway stations in the Republic of Ireland opened in 1848